Show Me Da Manny is a Philippine television situational comedy series broadcast by GMA Network. Starring Manny Pacquiao and Marian Rivera, it premiered on August 23, 2009 replacing Ful Haus. The series concluded on July 10, 2011 with a total of 98 episodes.

Cast and characters

Lead cast
Marian Rivera as Manuella "Ella/Manny" Paredes
Manny Pacquiao as Manuel "Manny" Santos

Supporting cast
Paolo Contis as Eric Paredes
Benjie Paras as Oscar Paredes
AJ Dee as Marco Antonio Barreiro
Gladys Guevarra as Banig
Onyok Velasco as J-R
Jai Reyes as Jai
Ogie Alcasid as Manny Pacute
Rochelle Pangilinan as Maria Juana 'Rihanna' Balbaqua
John Lapus as Nicolas 'Nicole' Ty
Lovi Poe as Hannah Montano
Kevin Santos as Chris Brawner
Mike Nacua as Usher
Lito Camo as Tolits
Carl Acosta  as Jonas
Marvin Kiefer as Marvin
Tuesday Vargas as Socorro "Shakira" Domingo

Ratings
According to AGB Nielsen Philippines' Mega Manila household television ratings, the pilot episode of Show Me Da Manny earned a 23.3% rating. While the final episode scored an 11.2% rating.

Accolades

References

External links
 

2009 Philippine television series debuts
2011 Philippine television series endings
Filipino-language television shows
GMA Network original programming
Philippine comedy television series
Philippine television sitcoms